Books and Bookmen was a literary magazine founded in 1955 by publisher Philip Dossé.  It was known for the vigour of its writers, especially the vituperative Auberon Waugh.

The publishing company, Hansom Books, folded in 1980 and the magazine was then relaunched under new management in the following year and continued publication until 1986.

References

Defunct literary magazines published in the United Kingdom
Magazines established in 1955
Magazines disestablished in 1986
Magazines published in London
Monthly magazines published in the United Kingdom